High-performance computing (HPC) uses supercomputers and computer clusters to solve advanced computation problems.

Overview
HPC integrates systems administration (including network and security knowledge) and parallel programming into a multidisciplinary field that combines digital electronics, computer architecture, system software, programming languages, algorithms and computational techniques.
HPC technologies are the tools and systems used to implement and create high performance computing systems. Recently, HPC systems have shifted from supercomputing to computing clusters and grids. Because of the need of networking in clusters and grids, High Performance Computing Technologies are being promoted by the use of a collapsed network backbone, because the collapsed backbone architecture is simple to troubleshoot and upgrades can be applied to a single router as opposed to multiple ones.

The term is most commonly associated with computing used for scientific research or computational science. A related term, high-performance technical computing (HPTC), generally refers to the engineering applications of cluster-based computing (such as computational fluid dynamics and the building and testing of virtual prototypes). HPC has also been applied to business uses  such as data warehouses, line-of-business (LOB) applications, and transaction processing.

High-performance computing (HPC) as a term arose after the term "supercomputing". HPC is sometimes used as a synonym for supercomputing; but, in other contexts, "supercomputer" is used to refer to a more powerful subset of "high-performance computers", and the term "supercomputing" becomes a subset of "high-performance computing". The potential for confusion over the use of these terms is apparent.

Because most current applications are not designed for HPC technologies but are retrofitted, they are not designed or tested for scaling to more powerful processors or machines. Since networking clusters and grids use multiple processors and computers, these scaling problems can cripple critical systems in future supercomputing systems. Therefore, either the existing tools do not address the needs of the high performance computing community or the HPC community is unaware of these tools. A few examples of commercial HPC technologies include:
 the simulation of car crashes for structural design
 molecular interaction for new drug design
 the airflow over automobiles or airplanes

In government and research institutions, scientists simulate galaxy creation, fusion energy, and global warming, as well as work to create more accurate short- and long-term weather forecasts. The world's tenth most powerful supercomputer in 2008, IBM Roadrunner (located at the United States Department of Energy's Los Alamos National Laboratory) simulated the performance, safety, and reliability of nuclear weapons and certifies their functionality.

TOP500
A list of the most powerful high-performance computers can be found on the TOP500 list. The TOP500 list ranks the world's 500 fastest high-performance computers, as measured by the High Performance LINPACK (HPL) benchmark. Not all computers are listed, either because they are ineligible (e.g., they cannot run the HPL benchmark) or because their owners have not submitted an HPL score (e.g., because they do not wish the size of their system to become public information for defense reasons). In addition, the use of the single LINPACK benchmark is controversial, in that no single measure can test all aspects of a high-performance computer. To help overcome the limitations of the LINPACK test, the U.S. government commissioned one of its originators, Jack Dongarra of the University of Tennessee, to create a suite of benchmark tests that includes LINPACK and others, called the HPC Challenge benchmark suite. This evolving suite has been used in some HPC procurements, but, because it is not reducible to a single number, it has been unable to overcome the publicity advantage of the less useful TOP500 LINPACK test. The TOP500 list is updated twice a year, once in June at the ISC European Supercomputing Conference and again at a US Supercomputing Conference in November.

Many ideas for the new wave of grid computing were originally borrowed from HPC.

High performance computing in the cloud 

Traditionally, HPC has involved an on-premise infrastructure, investing in supercomputers or computer clusters. Over the last decade, cloud computing has grown in popularity for offering computer resources in the commercial sector regardless of their investment capabilities. Some characteristics like scalability, and containerization also have raised interest in academia. However security in the cloud concerns such as data confidentiality are still considered when selecting a cloud or on-premise HPC.

See also

 High-performance technical computing
 Distributed computing
 Parallel computing
 Computational science
 Quantum computing
 Metacomputing
 Supercomputer
 Grand Challenge
 High Productivity Computing Systems
 High-availability cluster
 High-throughput computing
 Many-task computing
 Urgent computing
 Cloud computing

References

External links
 HPCwire
 Top 500 supercomputers
 Rocks Clusters Open-Source High Performance Linux Clusters
 News Articles & Policy Reports on High-Performance Scientific Computing
 The Center for Modeling Immunity to Enteric Pathogens (MIEP)
 The Art of HPC: Textbooks by Victor Eijkhout of TACC
 Vol.1: The Science of Computing
 Vol.2: Parallel Programming for Science Engineering
 Vol.3: Introduction to Scientific Programming in C++17/Fortran2008
 Vol.4: Tutorials for High Performance Scientific Computing

Parallel computing